Vyacheslav Lebedev may refer to:

 Vyacheslav Ivanovich Lebedev (1930–2010), Russian mathematician
 Vyacheslav Lebedev (born 1943), Russian jurist
 Vyacheslav I. Lebedev (born 1950), Russian apiologist